There are various names of Korea in use today, all derived from ancient kingdoms and dynasties. The modern English name "Korea" is an exonym derived from the name Goryeo, also spelled Koryŏ, and is used by both North Korea and South Korea in international contexts. In the Korean language, the two Koreas use different terms to refer to the nominally unified nation: Joseon in North Korea and Hanguk in South Korea. Ethnic Koreans living in China and Japan also use the term Joseon to refer to Korea.

History

The earliest records of Korean history are written in Chinese characters called hanja. Even after the invention of hangul, Koreans generally recorded native Korean names with hanja, by translation of meaning, transliteration of sound, or even combinations of the two. Furthermore, the pronunciations of the same character are somewhat different in Korean and the various Korean dialects, and have changed over time.

For all these reasons, in addition to the sparse and sometimes contradictory written records, it is often difficult to determine the original meanings or pronunciations of ancient names.

Ancient history

Gojoseon
Until 108 BC, northern Korea and part of  Manchuria were controlled by Gojoseon. The prefixing of Go-, meaning "old" or "ancient," is a historiographical convention that distinguishes it from the later Joseon Dynasty. The name Joseon is also now still used by North Koreans and Koreans living in China and Japan to refer to the peninsula, and as the official Korean form of the name of Democratic People's Republic of Korea (Joseon). Cognates of 朝鮮 Joseon are also used in many Asian languages, such as Japanese, Vietnamese, and Chinese, to refer to the Korean Peninsula.

Possibly the Chinese characters phonetically transcribed a native Korean name, perhaps pronounced something like "Jyusin".

Other scholars believe  was a translation of the native Korean Asadal, the capital of Gojoseon: asa being a hypothetical Altaic root word for "morning", and dal meaning "mountain", a common ending for Goguryeo place names.

An early attempt to translate these characters into English gave rise to the expression "The Land of the Morning Calm" for Korea, which parallels the expression "The Land of the Rising Sun" for Japan. While the wording is fanciful, the essence of the translation is valid.

Han
Around the time of Gojoseon's fall, various chiefdoms in southern Korea grouped into confederacies, collectively called the Samhan ("Three Han"). Han is a native Korean root for "leader" or "great", as in maripgan ("king", archaic), hanabi ("grandfather", archaic), and Hanbat ("Great Field", archaic name for Daejeon).

(See: Transcription into Chinese characters).

Beginning in the 7th century, the name "Samhan" became synonymous with the Three Kingdoms of Korea. According to the Samguk sagi and Samguk yusa, Silla implemented a national policy, "Samhan Unification", to integrate Baekje and Goguryeo refugees. In 1982, a memorial stone dating back to 686 was discovered in Cheongju with an inscription: "The Three Han were unified and the domain was expanded." During the Later Silla period, the concepts of Samhan as the ancient confederacies and the Three Kingdoms of Korea were merged. In a letter to an imperial tutor of the Tang dynasty, Choe Chiwon equated Byeonhan to Baekje, Jinhan to Silla, and Mahan to Goguryeo. By the Goryeo period, Samhan became a common name to refer to all of Korea. In his Ten Mandates to his descendants, Wang Geon declared that he had unified the Three Han (Samhan), referring to the Three Kingdoms of Korea. Samhan continued to be a common name for Korea during the Joseon period and was widely referenced in the Annals of the Joseon Dynasty.

In China, the Three Kingdoms of Korea were collectively called Samhan since the beginning of the 7th century. The use of the name Samhan to indicate the Three Kingdoms of Korea was widespread in the Tang dynasty. Goguryeo was alternately called Mahan by the Tang dynasty, as evidenced by a Tang document that called Goguryeo generals "Mahan leaders" in 645. In 651, Emperor Gaozong of Tang sent a message to the king of Baekje referring to the Three Kingdoms of Korea as Samhan. Epitaphs of the Tang dynasty, including those belonging to Baekje, Goguryeo, and Silla refugees and migrants, called the Three Kingdoms of Korea "Samhan", especially Goguryeo. For example, the epitaph of Go Hyeon, a Tang dynasty general of Goguryeo origin who died in 690, calls him a "Liaodong Samhan man". The History of Liao equates Byeonhan to Silla, Jinhan to Buyeo, and Mahan to Goguryeo.

The "Han" in the names of the Korean Empire, Daehan Jeguk, and the Republic of Korea (South Korea), Daehan Minguk or Hanguk, are named in reference to the Three Kingdoms of Korea, not the ancient confederacies in the southern Korean Peninsula.

Goryeo

Around the beginning of the Common Era, remnants of the fallen Gojoseon were re-united and expanded by the kingdom of Goguryeo, one of the Three Kingdoms of Korea. The source native name is thought to be either *Guru ("walled city, castle, fortress"; attested in Chinese historical documents, but not in native Korean sources) or *Gauri ("center, middle"; cf. Middle Korean *gaβɔndɔy and Standard Modern Korean gaunde ).

The theory that Goguryeo referenced the founder's surname has been largely discredited (the royal surname changed from Hae to Go long after the state's founding).

Revival of the names
In the south, the Samhan resolved into the kingdoms of Baekje and Silla, constituting, with Goguryeo, the Three Kingdoms of Korea. In 668, Silla unified the three kingdoms, and reigned as Later Silla until 935. The name Samhan became synonymous with the Three Kingdoms of Korea beginning in the 7th century, and by the Goryeo period it became a common name to refer to all of Korea.

The succeeding dynasty called itself Goryeo, and regarded itself as the successor to Goguryeo. The name Goryeo was the shortened form of Goguryeo and was first used during the reign of Jangsu in the 5th century. Through the Silk Road trade routes, Persian and Arab merchants brought knowledge about Silla and Goryeo to India and the Middle East. Goryeo was transliterated into Italian as "Cauli", the name Marco Polo used when mentioning the country in his Travels, derived from the Chinese form Gāolí.

In 1392, a new dynasty established by a military coup revived the name Joseon (Chosŏn), after the ancient state Gojoseon. The alternative name for this nation could have been Hwaryeong, but in the end, Taejo of Joseon decided to go with Joseon. The hanja for Joseon often translated into English as "morning calm/sun", and Korea's English nickname became "The Land of the Morning Calm"; however, this interpretation is not often used in the Korean language, and is more familiar to Koreans as a back-translation from English. This nickname was coined by Percival Lowell in his book, "Chosön, the Land of the Morning Calm," published in 1885.

In 1897, the nation was renamed Daehan Jeguk (literally, "Great Han Empire", known in English as Korean Empire). Han had been selected in reference to Samhan, specifically the Three Kingdoms of Korea, not the ancient confederacies in the southern Korean Peninsula. So, Daehan Jeguk means it is an empire that rules the area of Three Kingdoms of Korea. This name was used to emphasize independence of Korea, because an empire cannot be a subordinate country.

20th century
When the Korean Empire came under Japanese rule in 1910, the name reverted to Joseon (officially, the Japanese pronunciation Chōsen). During this period, many different groups outside of Korea fought for independence, the most notable being the Daehan Minguk Imsi Jeongbu, literally the "Provisional Government of the Great Han People's State", known in English as the Provisional Government of the Republic of Korea ( =  'people' +  country/state' = 'republic' in East Asian capitalist societies).

Korea became independent after World War II (1945) and the country was then divided.

In 1948, the South adopted the provisional government's name of Daehan Minguk (see above), known in English as the Republic of Korea, though commentators have noted that the English name is not a direct translation of the Korean one.

Meanwhile, the North became Chosŏn Minjujuŭi Inmin Konghwaguk, translated in English as the Democratic People's Republic of Korea. Each component of the name was carefully selected. Chosŏn was the natural choice for the short form, "Korea", since it had been used throughout the colonial period to denote the Peninsula. For the long form of the name, Konghwaguk was used for republic because of its leftist connotations over Minguk. North Koreans wanted to adopt something that had already been used in the Eastern Bloc to borrow legitimacy. A choice was presented between a "People's Republic" and a "Democratic Republic", because they had been used in the names of the short-lived Ukrainian People's Republic of Soviets and the Finnish Democratic Republic, respectively. "People's Republic" was favored by Pak Hon-yong of the Communist Party of Korea and it had already been used by the temporary People's Republic of Korea (PRK) formed in Seoul after liberation. "Democratic Republic", on the other hand, was associated with Mao Zedong's concept of New Democracy, which influenced Kim Tu-bong of the New People's Party of Korea. After his party merged with the Workers' Party of North Korea, the concept found its way to Kim Il-sung's parlance. Kim began to speak of a "Democratic People's Republic". This was echoed by what the true authorities of the country, the Soviet Civil Administration, prescribed, albeit in different order: "People's-Democratic Republic". Thus the name of the country became the "Korea(n) Democratic People's Republic" in Korean and "Korean People's-Democratic Republic" in Russian so that both parties could claim that they were behind the coining.

Current usage

East Asia

Korea
Today, South Koreans use Hanguk to refer to just South Korea or Korea as a whole, Namhan ("South Han") for South Korea, and Bukhan ("North Han") for North Korea. South Korea less formally refers to North Korea as Ibuk ("The North"). South Koreans often refer to Korea as "uri nara", meaning "our nation" or "our country". In addition, the official name for the Republic of Korea in the Korean language is "Daehan Minguk" (which is usually translated as "The Republic of Korea").

North Koreans use Chosŏn, Namjosŏn ("South Chosŏn"), and Pukchosŏn ("North Chosŏn") when referring to Korea, South Korea, and North Korea, respectively. The term Pukchosŏn, however, is rarely used in the north, although it may be found in pre-war sources, such as the Song of General Kim Il-sung. In the 1970s, Kim Il-sung suggested that in the event of a North Korean takeover of South Korea, "Koryo" could become the Korean name of the country.

In the tourist regions in North Korea and the official meetings between South Korea and North Korea, Namcheuk and Bukcheuk, or "southern side" and "northern side", are used instead of Namjosŏn and Bukhan.

The Korean language is called Hangukeo (referring to the Korean language) or Hangukmal (referring to spoken Korean only) in the South and Chosŏnmal or Chosŏnŏ in the North. The Korean script is called hangeul in South Korea and Chosŏn'gŭl in North Korea. The Korean Peninsula is called Hanbando in the South and Chosŏn Bando in the North.

Chinese-speaking areas
In Chinese-speaking areas such as China, Hong Kong, Macau and Taiwan, different naming conventions on several terms have been practiced according to their political proximity to whichever Korean government although there is a growing trend for convergence.

In the Chinese language, the Korean Peninsula is usually called Cháoxiǎn Bàndǎo and in rare cases called Hán Bàndǎo. Ethnic Koreans are also called Cháoxiǎnzú, instead of Dàhán mínzú. However, the term Hánguó ren may be used to specifically refer to South Koreans.

Before establishing diplomatic relations with South Korea, the People's Republic of China tended to use the historic Korean name Cháoxiǎn ( "Joseon" or "Chosŏn"), by referring to South Korea as Nán Cháoxiǎn ( "South Joseon"). Since diplomatic ties were restored, China has used the names that each of the two sides prefer, by referring to North Korea as Cháoxiǎn and to South Korea as Hánguó ( "Hanguk"). The Korean language can be referred to as either Cháoxiǎnyǔ or Hánguóyǔ. The Korean War is officially called the Kàngměi Yuáncháo Zhànzhēng ( "War to Resist America and Aid Korea") although the term Cháoxiǎn Zhànzhēng is also used in unofficial contexts.

Taiwan, on the other hand, uses the South Korean names, referring to North Korean as Běihán ( "North Han") and South Korean as Nánhán ( "South Han"). The Republic of China previously maintained diplomatic relations with South Korea, but has never had relations with North Korea. As a result, in the past, Hánguó had been used to refer to the whole Korea, and Taiwanese textbooks treated Korea as a unified nation. The Ministry of Foreign Affairs of the Republic of China under the Democratic Progressive Party Government considered North and South Koreas two separate countries. However, general usage in Taiwan is still to refer to North Korea as Běihán ( "North Han[guk]") and South Korea as Nánhán ( "South Han[guk]") while use of  – which in Taiwan is not pronounced Cháoxiǎn but Cháoxiān – is generally limited to ancient Korea. The Korean language is usually referred to as Hányǔ.

Similarly, general usage in Hong Kong and Macau has traditionally referred to North Korea as Bak Hon ( "North Han") and South Korea as Nam Hon ( "South Han"). Under the influence of official usage, which is itself influenced by the official usage of the People's Republic of China government, the mainland practice of naming the two Koreas differently has become more common.

In the Chinese language used in Singapore and Malaysia, North Korea is usually called Cháoxiǎn ( "Chosŏn") with Běi Cháoxiǎn ( "North Chosŏn") and Běihán ( "North Han") less often used, while South Korea is usually called Hánguó ( "Hanguk") with Nánhán ( "South Han[guk]") and Nán Cháoxiǎn ( "South Chosŏn") less often used.

In Hokkien speaking areas of chinese communities in countries like Taiwan and around Southeast Asia, Korea is called Hân-kok ( "Hanguk") where North Korea is referred to as Pak-hân ( "North Han") and South Korea as Lâm-hân ( "South Han").

The above usage pattern does not apply for Korea-derived words. For example, Korean ginseng is commonly called Gāolì shēn ("Koryo ginseng").

Japan
In Japan, North Korea is called Kita-Chōsen and South Korea Kankoku.

However, Japan-based North Koreans claim the name Kita-Chōsen is derogatory, as it only refers to the northern part of Korean Peninsula, whereas the government claims sovereignty over its whole territory. Pro-North people such as Chongryon use the name Kyōwakoku ("the Republic") instead, but the ambiguous name is not popular among others. In 1972, Chongryon campaigned to get the Japanese media to stop referring to North Korea as Kita-Chōsen. This effort was not successful, but as a compromise most media companies agreed to refer to the nation with its full official title at least once in every article, thus they used the lengthy Kita-Chōsen (Chōsen Minshu-shugi Jinmin Kyōwakoku) ("North Korea (Democratic People's Republic of Korea)"). By January 2003, this policy started to be abandoned by most newspapers, starting with Tokyo Shimbun, which announced that it would no longer write out the full name, followed by Asahi, Mainichi, and Nikkei.

For Korea as a whole, Chōsen ("Joseon") is commonly used. The term Chōsen, which has a longer usage history, continues to be used to refer to the Korean Peninsula, the Korean ethnic group, and the Korean language, which are use cases that would not cause confusion between Korea and North Korea. When referring to both North Korean and South Koreans, the transcription of phonetic English Korean (Korian) may be used because a reference to a Chōsen national may be interpreted as a North Korean national instead.

The Korean language is most frequently referred to in Japan as Kankokugo or Chōsengo. While academia mostly prefers Chōsengo, Kankokugo became more and more common in non-academic fields, thanks to the economic and cultural presence of South Korea. The language is also referred to as various combined terms, such as Kankoku-Chōsen-go, Chōsen-Kankoku-go, "Kankokugo (Chōsengo)", etc. Some people refer to the language as Koriago, using the European name for Korea. This term is not used in ordinary Japanese, but was selected as a compromise to placate both nations in a euphemistic process called kotobagari. Likewise, when NHK broadcasts a language instruction program for Korean, the language is referred to as hangurugo ("hangul language"); although it's technically incorrect since hangul itself is a writing system, not a language. Some argue that even Hangurugo is not completely neutral, since North Korea calls the letter Chosŏn'gŭl, not hangul. Urimaru, a direct transcription of uri mal ("our language") is sometimes used by Korean residents in Japan, as well as by KBS World Radio. This term, however, may not be suitable to ethnic Japanese whose "our language" is not necessarily Korean.

Uri (우리 "we/us/our") is the first-person plural pronoun and it is commonly used as a prefix in Korean terms to describe things that are Korean, such as uri nara (우리 나라, "our country") which is yet another name Koreans give their country.

In Japan, those who moved to Japan usually maintain their distinctive cultural heritages (such as the Baekje-towns or Goguryeo-villages). Ethnic Korean residents of Japan have been collectively called Zainichi Chōsenjin ( "Joseon People in Japan"), regardless of nationality. However, for the same reason as above, the euphemism Zainichi Korian ("Koreans in Japan") is increasingly used today. Zainichi ("In Japan") itself is also often used colloquially. People with North Korean nationality are called Zainichi Chōsenjin, while those with South Korean nationality, sometimes including recent newcomers, are called Zainichi Kankokujin ( "Hanguk People in Japan").

Mongolia
Mongolian people have their own word for Korea: Солонгос (Solongos). In Mongolian, solongo means "rainbow." And another theory is probably means derived from Solon tribe living in Manchuria, a tribe culturally and ethnically related to the Korean people. North and South Korea are, accordingly, Хойд Солонгос (Hoid Solongos) and Өмнөд Солонгос (Ömnöd Solongos).

The name of either Silla or its capital Seora-beol was also widely used throughout Northeast Asia as the ethnonym for the people of Silla, appearing [...] as Solgo or Solho in the language of the medieval Jurchens and their later descendants, the Manchus respectively.

Vietnamese-speaking areas
In Vietnam, people call North Korea  ("Chosŏn") and South Korea  ("Hanguk"). After unification, the northern Vietnamese terminology persisted until the 1990s. When South Korea reestablished diplomatic relations with Vietnam in 1993, it requested that Vietnam use the name that it uses for itself, and  gradually replaced  in usage.

In the Vietnamese language used in the United States, Bắc Hàn and Nam Hàn are most common used.

Outside East Asia

English usage and spelling
Both South and North Korea use the name "Korea" when referring to their countries in English. North Korea is sometimes referred to as "Democratic People's Republic of Korea" (DPRK) and South Korea is sometimes referred to as the "Republic of Korea" (ROK). The official names of both entities are also used by organizations such as United Nations, International Olympic Committee and media such as the Associated Press, China Global Television Network (CGTN), and several others.

As with other European languages, English historically had a variety of names for Korea. These included "Cauli" (Marco Polo's rendering of Goryeo), Caule, Core, Cory, Caoli, and Corai as well as two spellings that survived into the 19th century, Corea and Korea. The modern spelling, "Korea", first appeared in the late 17th century in the travel writings of the Dutch East India Company's Hendrick Hamel. The terms "Chosunese" or "Chosonese" were first used to refer to the people of Joseon in the late 19th century but were eventually phased out.

Both major English-speaking governments in the 19th and 20th centuries (the United States and the United Kingdom and its empire) used both "Korea" and "Corea" until the early part of the period of Japanese occupation. English-language publications in the 19th century generally used the spelling Corea, which was also used at the founding of the UK's embassy in Seoul in 1890. However, at the turn of the century, the then U.S. minister and consul general to Korea, Horace Newton Allen, used "Korea" in his works published on the country. At the official Korean exhibit at the World's Columbian Exhibition in Chicago in 1893 a sign was posted by the Korean Commissioner saying of his country's name that "'Korea' and 'Corea' are both correct, but the former is preferred." This may have had something to do with Allen's influence, as he was heavily involved in the planning and participation of the Korean exhibit at Chicago.

A shift can also be seen in Korea itself, where postage stamps issued in 1884 used the name "Corean Post" in English, but those from 1885 and thereafter used "Korea" or "Korean Post".

By the first two decades of the 20th century, "Korea" began to be seen more frequently than "Corea" – a change that coincided with Japan's consolidation of its grip over the peninsula.  However, the spelling "Corea" was occasionally used even under full colonial rule and both it and "Korea" were largely eschewed in favor of the Japanese-derived "Chosen", which itself was derived from "Joseon".

A theory that grew in popularity in South Korea in the early 2000s and especially during the 2002 joint World Cup (and endorsed by the North Korean state) was that Japan as occupier had intentionally standardized the spelling on "Korea", allegedly so that "Japan" would appear first alphabetically. However, evidence of a deliberate name change orchestrated by Japanese authorities is circumstantial, for example, a 1912 memoir by a Japanese colonial official that complained of the Koreans' tendency "to maintain they are an independent country by insisting on using a C to write their country's name."

Other languages

European languages use variations of the name "Korea" for both North and South Korea. In general, Celtic and Romance languages spell it "Corea" (or variations) since "c" represents the  sound in most Romance and Celtic orthographies. However, languages that have a general preference towards representing  with "k" rather than "c", such as most Germanic or Slavic languages, generally use variants of "Korea" instead. In languages using other alphabets such as Russian (Cyrillic), variations phonetically similar to "Korea" are also used for example the Russian name for Korea is Корея, romanization Koreya or Koreja. Outside of Europe, most languages also use variants of "Korea", often adopted to local orthographies. Some Languages, especially Romance Languages like Italian, French and Spanish still use the old Spelling "Corea" (As Corea, Corée and Córea respectively). "Korea" in the Jurchen Jin's national language (Jurchen) is "Sogo". "Korea" in the conlang Esperanto is "Koreio". "Korea" in Hmong is "Kauslim" ("s" and "m" represent tones, not consonants).

Koreans abroad
Emigrants who moved to Russia and Central Asia call themselves Goryeoin or Koryo-saram (literally "person or people of Goryeo"), or Koreytsi in Russian. Many Goryeoin are living in the CIS, including an estimated 106,852 in Russia, 22,000 in Uzbekistan, 20,000 in Kyrgyzstan, 17,460 in Kazakhstan, 8,669 in Ukraine, 2,000 in Belarus, 350 in Moldova, 250 in Georgia, 100 in Azerbaijan, and 30 in Armenia. As of 2005, there are also 1.9 million ethnic Koreans living in China who hold Chinese citizenship and a further 560,000 Korean expatriates from both North and South living in China.

South Korean expatriates living in the U.S. may refer to themselves as Jaemi(-)gyopo, or "gyopo" for short.

Names of Unified Korean sporting teams

Sobriquets of Korea

In traditional Korean culture, as well as in the cultural tradition of East Asia, the land of Korea has assumed a number of sobriquets over the centuries, including:

 Gyerim, "Rooster Forest", in reference to an early name for Silla.
 Gunjaji-guk, or "Land of Scholarly Gentlemen".
 Geumsu gangsan, "Land of Embroidered (or Splendid) Rivers and Mountains".
 Danguk, "Country of Dangun".
 Daedong, "Great East".
 Dongguk, "Eastern Country".
 Dongbang, literally "an Eastern Country" referring to Korea.
 Dongbang yeuiji-guk, "Eastern Country of Courtesy".
 Dongya, "Eastern Plains".
 Dong-i, or "Eastern Foreigners".
 Gu-i, "Nine-i", refers to ancient tribes in the Korean peninsula.
 Dongto, "Eastern Land".
 Baeguiminjok, "The white-clad race".
 Three-thousand Li, a reference to the length traditionally attributed to the country from its northern to southern tips plus eastern to western tips. 
 Sojunghwa, "Small China" or "Little Sinocentrism" was used by the Joseon Court. It is nowadays considered degrading and is not used.
 Asadal, apparently an Old Korean term for Joseon.
 Cheonggu, or "Azure Hills". The color Azure is associated with the East. 
 Paldo gangsan, "Rivers and Mountains of the Eight Provinces", referring to the traditional eight provinces of Korea.
 Geunhwahyang, "Country of Mugunghwa" refer to Silla Kingdom.
 Geunyeok, "Hibiscus Territory", or Land of Hibiscus 
 Samhan, or "Three Hans", refers to Samhan confederacy that ruled Southern Korea. Beginning in the 7th century, Samhan became synonymous with the Three Kingdoms of Korea.
 Haedong, "East of the Sea" (here being the West Sea separating from Korea).
 Haedong samguk, "Three Kingdoms East of the Sea" refers to Three Kingdoms of Korea
 Haedong seongguk, literally "Flourishing Eastern Sea Country", historically refers to Balhae Kingdom of north–south period.
 Jinguk, "Shock Country", old name of Balhae Kingdom.
 Jinyeok, "Eastern Domain".
 Jindan, "Eastern Country of Dangun".
 Jinguk, "Country of Early Morning", refer to the Jin state of Gojoseon period.

See also
History of Korea
Romanization of Korean
Little China (ideology)

Notes

References

Further reading

History of Korea
Korean culture
Korea
Korea